L. fragilis may refer to:
 Lactarius fragilis, a mushroom species
 Leptodactylus fragilis, a frog species
 Limnonectes fragilis, a frog species endemic to China
Leptodea fragilis, a freshwater mussel species

See also
 Fragilis (disambiguation)